Tatarstan, officially the Republic of Tatarstan, sometimes also called Tataria, is a republic of the Russian Federation, located in Eastern Europe. It is a part of the Volga Federal District; and its capital and largest city is Kazan, an important cultural centre in Russia.

The republic borders the oblasts of Kirov, Ulyanovsk, Samara, and Orenburg, as well as the republics of Mari El, Udmurtia, Chuvashia, and Bashkortostan. As of the 2021 Census, the population of Tatarstan was 4,004,809.

Tatarstan has strong cultural, linguistic, and ethnic ties with its eastern neighbour Bashkortostan.

The official languages of the republic are Tatar and Russian.

Etymology 

"Tatarstan" derives from the name of the ethnic group—the Tatars—and the Persian suffix -stan (meaning "state" or "country" of, an ending common to many Eurasian countries). Another version of the Russian name is "", which was official along with "Tatar ASSR" during Soviet rule.

Geography 

It lies between the Volga River and the Kama River (a tributary of the Volga), and extends east to the Ural mountains.
 Borders:
 internal: Kirov Oblast (N), Udmurt Republic (N/NE), Republic of Bashkortostan (E/SE), Orenburg Oblast (SE), Samara Oblast (S), Ulyanovsk Oblast (S/SW), Chuvash Republic (W), Mari El Republic (W/NW).
 Highest point: 
 Maximum N–S distance: 
 Maximum E–W distance:

Rivers 

Major rivers include (Tatar names are given in parentheses):
 Azevka River (Äzi)
 Belaya River (Ağidel)
 Ik River (Iq)
 Kama River (Çulman)
 Volga River (İdel)
 Vyatka River (Noqrat)
 Kazanka River (Qazansu)
 Zay River (Zäy)

Lakes 
Major reservoirs of the republic include (Tatar names are given in parentheses):
 Kuybyshev Reservoir (Kuybışev)
 Lower Kama Reservoir (Tübän Kama)
 Zainsk Reservoir (Zäy susaqlağıçı)
The biggest lake is Qaban. The biggest swamp is Kulyagash.

Hills 
 Bugulma-Belebey Upland
 Volga Upland
 Vyatskiye Uvaly

Natural resources 
Major natural resources of Tatarstan include oil, natural gas, gypsum, and more. It is estimated that the Republic has over one billion tons of oil deposits.

Climate 
 Average January temperature: 
 Average July temperature: 
 Average annual temperature: +
 Average annual precipitation: up to

Administrative divisions 

Administrative and territorial division: 43 municipal districts and 2 urban districts (Kazan and Naberezhnye Chelny), as well as 39 urban settlements and 872 rural settlements.
The Republic of Tatarstan consists of districts and cities of republican significance, the list of which is established by the Constitution of the Republic of Tatarstan. The districts consist of cities of district significance, urban-type settlements and rural settlements with subordinate territories that make up the primary level in the system of administrative-territorial structure of the Republic. Cities of national significance can be geographically divided into districts in the city.

History

Middle Ages 
The earliest known organized state within the boundaries of Tatarstan was Volga Bulgaria (c. 700–1238). The Volga Bulgars had an advanced mercantile state with trade contacts throughout Inner Eurasia, the Middle East, and the Baltic, which maintained its independence despite pressure by such nations as the Khazars, the Kievan Rus, and the Cuman-Kipchaks. Islam was introduced by missionaries from Baghdad around the time of Ibn Fadlan's journey in 922.

Volga Bulgaria finally fell to the armies of the Mongol prince Batu Khan in the late 1230s (see Mongol invasion of Volga Bulgaria). The inhabitants, a large amount of them killed and the rest mixing with the Golden Horde's Kipchaks, became known as the "Volga Tatars". In the 1430s, the region again became independent as the base of the Khanate of Kazan, a capital having been established in Kazan,  up the Volga from the ruined capital of the Bulgars.

The Khanate of Kazan was conquered by the troops of Tsar Ivan the Terrible in the 1550s, with Kazan being taken in 1552. A large number of tatars were forcibly converted to Christianity and were culturally Russified. Cathedrals were built in Kazan; by 1593 all mosques in the area were destroyed. The Russian government forbade the construction of mosques, a prohibition that was not lifted until the 18th century by Catherine the Great. The first mosque to be rebuilt under Catherine's auspices was constructed in 1766–1770.

19th century 

In the 19th century, Tatarstan became a center of Jadidism, an Islamic movement that preached tolerance of other religions. Under the influence of local Jadidist theologians, the Bulgars were renowned for their friendly relations with other peoples of the Russian Empire. However, after the October Revolution religion was largely outlawed and all theologians were repressed.

20th century 

During the Civil War of 1918–1920 Tatar nationalists attempted to establish an independent republic (the Idel-Ural State, Idel being the name of the Volga in Tatar) along with the neighboring Bashkirs. Initially supported by the Bolsheviks, the state existed up until March 1918, when high-ranking members of its parliament were arrested by the Bolsheviks (who had turned on the state and denounced it as bourgeois) before the official declaration of its constitution. The Soviets later set up the Tatar Autonomous Soviet Socialist Republic, which was established on May 27, 1920. The boundaries of the republic did not include a majority of the Volga Tatars. The Tatar Union of the Godless were persecuted in Stalin's 1928 purges.

A famine occurred in the Tatar Autonomous Soviet Socialist Republic in 1921-1922 as a result of the policy of war communism. The famine deaths of over 2 million Tatars in the Tatar ASSR and in the Volga-Ural region in 1921–1922 was catastrophic as half of the Volga Tatar population in the USSR died.

Present day 

On August 30, 1990, Tatarstan declared its sovereignty with the Declaration on the State Sovereignty of the Tatar Soviet Socialist Republic and in 1992 Tatarstan held a referendum on the new constitution. Some 62% of those who took part voted in favor of the constitution. In the 1992 Tatarstan Constitution, Tatarstan is defined as a Sovereign State. However, the referendum and constitution were declared unconstitutional by the Russian Constitutional Court. Articles 1 and 3 of the Constitution as introduced in 2002 define Tatarstan as a part of the Russian Federation, removing the "sovereignty" term.

On February 15, 1994, the Treaty On Delimitation of Jurisdictional Subjects and Mutual Delegation of Authority between the State Bodies of the Russian Federation and the State Bodies of the Republic of Tatarstan and Agreement between the Government of the Russian Federation and the Government of the Republic of Tatarstan (On Delimitation of Authority in the Sphere of Foreign Economic Relations) were signed. The power-sharing agreement was renewed on July 11, 2007, though with much of the power delegated to Tatarstan reduced.

On December 20, 2008, in response to Russia recognizing Abkhazia and South Ossetia, the Milli Mejlis of the Tatar People organization declared Tatarstan independent and asked for United Nations recognition. However, this declaration was ignored both by the United Nations and the Russian government. On July 24, 2017, the autonomy agreement signed in 1994 between Moscow and Kazan expired, making Tatarstan the last republic of Russia to lose its special status.

Demographics 
Population:

Settlements

Vital statistics 

Note: TFR source.

Ethnic groups 

There are about 2 million ethnic Tatars and 1.5 million ethnic Russians, along with significant numbers of Chuvash, Mari, and Udmurts, some of whom are Tatar-speaking. The Ukrainian, Mordvin, and Bashkir minorities are also significant. Most Tatars are Sunni Muslims, but a small minority known as Keräşen Tatars are Orthodox and some of them regard themselves as being different from other Tatars even though most Keräşen dialects differ only slightly from the Central Dialect of the Tatar language.

There is a fair degree of speculation as to the early origins of the different groups of Tatars, but most Tatars no longer view religious identity as being as important as it once was, and the religious and linguistic subgroups have intermingled considerably. Nevertheless, despite many decades of assimilation and intermingling, some Keräşen demanded and were awarded the option of being specifically enumerated in 2002. This has provoked great controversy, however, as many intellectuals have sought to portray the Tatars as homogeneous and indivisible. Although listed separately below, the Keräşen are still included in the grand total for the Tatars. Another unique ethnic group, concentrated in Tatarstan, is the Qaratay Mordvins.

Jews 

Tatar and Udmurt Jews are special territorial groups of the Ashkenazi Jews, which started to be formed in the residential areas of mixed Turkic-speaking (Tatars, Kryashens, Bashkirs, Chuvash people), Finno-Ugric-speaking (Udmurts, Mari people) and Slavic-speaking (Russians) populations. The Ashkenazi Jews on the territory of Tatarstan first appeared in the 1830s. The Jews of Udmurtia and Tatarstan are subdivided by cultural and linguistic characteristics into two territorial groups: 1) Udmurt Jews (Udmurt Jewry), who lived on the territory of Udmurtia and the north of Tatarstan; 2) Tatar Jews, or Kazan Jews (Tatar Jewry or Kazan Jewry), who lived mainly in the city of Kazan and its agglomeration.

Languages 
In accordance with the Constitution of the Republic of Tatarstan, the two state languages of the republic are Tatar and Russian. According to the 2002 Russian Federal Law (On Languages of Peoples of the Russian Federation), the official script is Cyrillic. Linguistic anthropologist Dr. Suzanne Wertheim notes that "some men signal ideological devotion to the Tatar cause by refusing to accommodate to Russian-dominant public space or Russian speakers", whilst women, in promoting "the Tatar state and Tatar national culture, index their pro-Tatar ideological stances more diplomatically, and with linguistic practices situated only within the Tatar-speaking community... in keeping with normative gender roles within the Tatar republic."

Religion 

Today, Islam is a major faith in Tatarstan, adhered to by 55 percent As of 2012, Islam was the most common faith in Tatarstan, as, 53.8% of the estimated 3.8 million population is Muslim while the remaining population is mostly Russian Orthodox Christian and non-religious.

Established in 922, the first Muslim state within the boundaries of modern Russia was Volga Bulgaria from which the Tatars inherited Islam. Islam was introduced by missionaries from Baghdad around the time of Ibn Fadlan's journey in 922. Islam's long presence in Russia also extends at least as far back as the conquest of the Khanate of Kazan in 1552, which brought the Tatars and Bashkirs on the Middle Volga into Russia.

In the 1430s, the region became independent as the base of the Khanate of Kazan, a capital having been established in Kazan, 170 km up the Volga from the ruined capital of the Bulgars. The Khanate of Kazan was conquered by the troops of Tsar Ivan IV the Terrible in the 1550s, with Kazan being taken in 1552. Some Tatars were forcibly converted to Christianity and cathedrals were built in Kazan; by 1593, mosques in the area were destroyed. The Russian government forbade the construction of mosques, a prohibition that was not lifted until the 18th century by Catherine II.

In 1990, there were only 100 mosques but the number, as of 2004, rose to well over 1,000. As of January 1, 2008, as many as 1,398 religious organizations were registered in Tatarstan, of which 1,055 were Muslim. In September 2010, Eid al-Fitr as well May 21, the day the Volga Bulgars embraced Islam, were made public holidays. 

The Russian Orthodox Church is the second largest active religion in Tatarstan, and has been so for more than 150 years, with an estimated 1.6 million followers made up of ethnic Russians, Mordvins, Armenians, Belarusians, Mari people, Georgians, Chuvash and a number of Orthodox Tatars which together constitute 38% of the 3.8 million population of Tatarstan. On 23 August 2010, the "Orthodox monuments of Tatarstan" exhibition was held in Kazan by the Tatarstan Ministry of Culture and the Kazan Eparchy. At all public events, an Orthodox Priest is called upon along with an Islamic Mufti.

The Muslim Religious Board of Tatarstan frequently organizes activities, like the 'Islamic graffiti Contest' which was held on November 20, 2011.

Politics 

The head of the republic is the president, who has been Rustam Minnikhanov since 2010.

Tatarstan's unicameral State Council has 100 seats: fifty are for representatives of the parties, and the other fifty are for deputies from the republic's localities. The Chairman of the State Council is Farit Mukhametshin, who has served since May 27, 1998. The government is the Сabinet of Ministers. The Prime Minister of the Republic of Tatarstan is Alexei Pesoshin.

According to the Constitution of the Republic of Tatarstan, the President can be elected only by the people of Tatarstan, but due to Russian federal law, this law was suspended for an indefinite term. The Russian law on the election of governors says they should be elected by regional parliaments and that the candidate can be presented only by the president of Russia.

In December 2022, regional lawmakers voted to change the title of the head of the republic from president to rais (an Arabic title for "leader"); lawmakers were expected to adopt new amendments to Tatarstan's constitution so that it would be in line with the 2020 amendments to the Constitution of Russia and a federal law in 2021 which abolished regional presidencies. The title of president was seen as the last remaining symbol of federalism following the centralization reforms under Vladimir Putin. Incumbent president Rustam Minnikhanov however will retain the title of president until his term expires in 2025 under transitional agreements.

Political status 

The Republic of Tatarstan is a constituent republic of the Russian Federation. Most of the Russian federal subjects are tied with the Russian federal government by the uniform Federal Treaty, but relations between the government of Tatarstan and the Russian federal government are more complex and are precisely defined in the Constitution of the Republic of Tatarstan. The following passage from the Constitution defines the republic's status without contradicting the Constitution of the Russian Federation:

"The Republic of Tatarstan is a democratic constitutional State associated with the Russian Federation by the Constitution of the Russian Federation, the Constitution of the Republic of Tatarstan and the Treaty between the Russian Federation and the Republic of Tatarstan On Delimitation of Jurisdictional Subjects and Mutual Delegation of Powers between the State Bodies of the Russian Federation and the State Bodies of the Republic of Tatarstan, and a subject of the Russian Federation. The sovereignty of the Republic of Tatarstan shall consist in full possession of the State authority (legislative, executive and judicial) beyond the competence of the Russian Federation and powers of the Russian Federation in the sphere of shared competence of the Russian Federation and the Republic of Tatarstan and shall be an inalienable qualitative status of the Republic of Tatarstan."

Russo-Ukrainian War 
After the decree on September 21st, 2022 mandating military mobilization in Russia, Tatarstan’s government temporarily banned reservists from “traveling outside their district.” So far, 307 have died in the conflict, as acknowledged by Russia, victims’ families, or other organizations.

Economy 

Tatarstan is one of the most economically developed regions of Russia. The republic is highly industrialized and ranks second to Samara Oblast in terms of industrial production per km2. in 2017 Tatarstan's GDP per capita was $10,000, with total GDP at about $35 billion.

The region's main source of wealth is oil. Tatarstan produces 32 million tonnes of crude oil per year and has estimated oil reserves of more than 1 billion tons. Industrial production constitutes 45% of the Republic's gross regional domestic product. The most developed manufacturing industries are petrochemical industry and machine building. The truck-maker KamAZ is the region's largest enterprise and employs about one-fifth of Tatarstan's workforce. Kazanorgsintez, based in Kazan, is one of Russia's largest chemical companies. Tatarstan's aviation industry produces Tu-214 passenger airplanes and helicopters. The Kazan Helicopter Plant is one of the largest helicopter manufacturers in the world. Engineering, textiles, clothing, wood processing, and food industries are also of key significance in Tatarstan.

Tatarstan consists of three distinct industrial regions. The northwestern part is an old industrial region where engineering, chemical, and light industry dominate. In the newly industrial northeast region with its core in the Naberezhnye Chelny–Nizhnekamsk agglomeration, major industries are automobile construction, the chemical industry, and power engineering. The southeast region has oil production with engineering under development. The north, central, south, and southwest parts of the republic are rural regions. The republic has huge water resources—the annual flow of rivers of the Republic exceeds . Soils are very diverse, the best fertile soils covering one-third of the territory. Due to the high development of agriculture in Tatarstan (it contributes 5.1% of the total revenue of the republic), forests occupy only 16% of its territory. The agricultural sector of the economy is represented mostly by large companies as Ak Bars Holding and "Krasnyi Vostok Agro".

The republic has a highly developed transport network. It mainly comprises highways, railway lines, four navigable rivers — Volga (İdel), Kama (Çulman), Vyatka (Noqrat) and Belaya (Ağidel), and oil pipelines and airlines. The territory of Tatarstan is crossed by the main gas pipelines carrying natural gas from Urengoy and Yamburg to the west and the major oil pipelines supplying oil to various cities in the European part of Russia.

Tourism 

There are three UNESCO world heritage sites in Tatarstan—Kazan Kremlin, Bulgarian State Museum-Reserve, and Assumption Cathedral and Monastery of the town-island of Sviyazhsk.

The annual growth rate of tourist flow to the republic is on average 13.5%; the growth rate of the volume of services in the tourism sector is 17.0%.

At the end of 2016, on the territory of the Republic of Tatarstan there were 104 tour operators, of which 32 dealt in domestic tourism, 65 in domestic and inbound tourism, 1 in domestic and outbound tourism, and 6 in all three.

As of January 1, 2017, 404 collective accommodation facilities (CSR) operate in the Republic of Tatarstan; 379 CSR are subject to classification (183 in Kazan, 196 in other municipalities of the Republic of Tatarstan). 334 collective accommodation facilities received the certificate of assignment of the category, which is 88.1% of the total number of operating.

In 2016, special attention was paid to the development of tourist centers of the Republic of Tatarstan—Kazan, Bolghar, the town-island of Sviyazhsk, Yelabuga, Chistopol, and Tetyushi. The growth of tourist flow in the main tourist centers of the Republic compared to 2015 amounted to an average of 45.9%.

Currently, sanatorium and resort recreation is developing rapidly in Tatarstan. There are 46 sanatorium-resort institutions in the Republic of Tatarstan. The capacity of the objects of the sanatorium-resort complex of Tatarstan is 8847 beds; more than 4300 specialists are engaged in the service of residents. In 2016, more than 160 thousand people rested in the health resorts of the Republic of Tatarstan. 22 health resort institutions of the Republic of Tatarstan are members of the Association of health resort institutions "Health resorts of Tatarstan," including 11 sanatoriums of PJSC "Tatneft."

Since 2016, the Republic of Tatarstan has been operating the Visit Tatarstan program, the official tourism brand of the Republic, the purpose of which is to inform tourists, monitor the reputation of the Republic, develop the tourism potential of the regions of Tatarstan, conduct market research, create partner projects with local companies, and expand internationally. "Tatarstan: 1001 pleasure" is the main message that tourists receive. The Visit Tatar website, where there is information about the main sights and recreation in Tatarstan, is available in 8 languages: Tatar, Russian, English, Chinese, German, Spanish, Finnish, and Persian.

Tourist resources of historical and cultural significance 

 Kazan Kremlin
 Kazan University
 Bolghar
 Sviyazhsk
 Temple of All Religions
 Qolşärif Mosque
 Saints Peter and Paul Cathedral
 Söyembikä Tower
 Millennium Bridge
 Old Tatar Quarter
 Galiaskar Kamal Tatar Academic Theatre
 The Jalil Opera and Ballet Theatre
 The National Museum of Tatarstan

Culture 
Due to Islamic rules on artistic depictions, Tatars developed a uniquely geometric artistry, of which the craft of leather mosaic is a staple. They also observe certain pre-Islamic holidays, such as Sabantuy, which celebrates “the completion of spring sowing works.”

Major libraries include Kazan State University Nikolai Lobachevsky Scientific Library and the National Library of the Republic of Tatarstan. There are two museums of republican significance, as well as 90 museums of local importance. In the past several years, new museums appeared throughout the Republic.

There are twelve theatrical institutions in Tatarstan. The state orchestra is the National Tatarstan Orchestra.

In 1996, the Tatar singer, Guzel Ahmetova, cooperated with the German Eurodance group named Snap!, when she sang the lyrics of the song "Rame".

Aida Garifullina was born in 1987 to a Tatar family in Kazan. Following studies in Nuremberg, Germany and Vienna, Austria, she has achieved fame as a lyric soprano, in high demand both on the international operatic stage and concert platform. She is also a celebrated recording artist and a promoter of the Tatar culture.

Sports 

With 9175 sports venues in Tatarstan, the republic is one of the leading sports regions in Russia.

Tatarstan has Rubin Kazan, a major European football team which has played in the UEFA Champions League and the UEFA Europa League. Twice Russian champions, Rubin Kazan play in the Russian Premier League. Also, Tatarstan has Unics Kazan which has gained a significant role in European basketball, playing in Euroleague and EuroCup for decades.

It also has two KHL teams, the successful Ak Bars Kazan, which is based in the capital city of Kazan, and the Neftekhimik Nizhnekamsk, who play in the city of Nizhnekamsk. The state also has a Russian Major League team (the second highest hockey league in Russia), Neftyanik Almetyevsk, who play in the city of Almetyevsk. There are also two Minor Hockey League teams which serve as affiliates for the two KHL teams. A team also exists in the Russian Hockey League, the HC Chelny, which is based in the city of Naberezhnye Chelny. Another team plays in the MHL-B (the second level of junior ice hockey in Russia).

Nail Yakupov is an ethnic Tatar who was drafted first overall in the 2012 NHL Entry Draft.

Former ATP No. 1 Marat Safin and former WTA number 1 Dinara Safina are of Tatar descent.

Victor Wild and Danil Sadreev are both Tatarstan Olympians, having won a bronze in parallel giant slalom and and a silver in ski jumping, respectively.

Kazan hosted the XXVII Summer Universiade in 2013, the FINA World championship in aquatic sports in August 2015, and the World Junior Championship for swimming in 2022. Kazan also was offered to host the 2036 Summer Olympics, but due to political circumstances, Tatarstan's sport minister admitted the likelihood of it happening was uncertain.

Education 
The most important facilities of higher education include Kazan Federal University, Kazan State Medical University, Kazan National Research Technological University, World Information Distributed University, Kazan National Research Technical University named after A.N.Tupolev and Russian Islamic University, all located in the capital Kazan.

Public spaces 
Tatarstan takes a unique participatory approach to the development of public spaces that has earned it recognition. The Tatarstan Public Spaces Development Programme aims to create spaces for meeting or recreation. The programme covers a wide spectrum of projects, including streets, squares, parks, river banks, pavilions, and sports facilities.

Since 2016 (and continuing until 2022), the Architecturny Desant Architectural Bureau in Kazan is improving public spaces in each of Tatarstan's 45 municipal districts, from large cities to small villages. As of April 2019, the project had revamped 328 public spaces. By creating and rehabilitating public spaces, the programme aims to be a catalyst for positive social, economic, and environmental change.

One notable example is the "Beach" at Almetyevsk, which includes public swimming pools and a terrace. Other examples include an amphitheatre in Black Lake Park, Kazan; the Central Square in Bavly; a children's playground in Bogatye Saby village, which has a unique wooden play structure; the Cube container centre in the green beach at Gorkinsko-Ometievsky forest, Kazan; and the square on Festival Boulevard, Kazan.

The programme used an innovative participatory design approach, which later became mandatory for similar projects across Russia. This approach partners specialists with local residents at every stage of the project, from development, to implementation, to the ongoing use of the space.

The Tatarstan Public Spaces Development Programme was announced as one of the six winners of the 2019 Aga Khan Award for Architecture. The jury was impressed by the programme's systematic approach and involvement of residents to decide the future of each space.

Each public space expresses the unique identity of that particular place, tying in its history while incorporating traditional materials. Major goals of the projects include improving the quality of life for residents and improving the environment. The Arhitekturnyi Desant team aims to provide a high quality public space, no matter the size of the settlement, including quality design, infrastructure, and materials.

Spending on the public spaces projects is helping the local economy. For example, the number of street furniture manufacturers in the area increased from 12 to 75 since the programme started.

See also 
 List of Chairmen of the State Council of Tatarstan
 List of rural localities in Tatarstan
 List of Tatars
 Music of Tatarstan

Notes

References

Sources 
 
 
 Госкомстат РФ. Государственный комитет Республики Татарстан по статистике. "Административно-территориальное деление Республики Татарстан" (Administrative-Territorial Structure of the Republic of Tatarstan). Казань, 1997.

Further reading 
 
 
 Ruslan Kurbanov. Tatarstan: Smooth Islamization Sprinkled with Blood OnIslam.net. Accessed: Feb. 26, 2013.
 Daniel Kalder. Lost Cosmonaut: Observations of an Anti-tourist.
 Ravil Bukharaev. The Model of Tatarstan: Under President Mintimer Shaimiev.
 Azadeayse Rorlich. The Volga Tatars: A Profile in National Resilience.
 Roderick Heather. Russia From Red to Black

External links 

 Official website of the Republic of Tatarstan
 Official website of the Republic of Tatarstan  
 Official website of the Republic of Tatarstan 
 Tatar-Inform information agency
 Official Tourist Portal of the Republic of Tatarstan

 
States and territories established in 1920
Members of the Unrepresented Nations and Peoples Organization
Tatar topics
Russian-speaking countries and territories
Regions of Europe with multiple official languages
1920 establishments in Europe
Observer members of the International Organization of Turkic Culture